Cwmsyfiog Halt railway station served the suburb of Cwmsyfiog, Monmouthshire, Wales, from 1937 to 1962 on the Brecon and Merthyr Tydfil Junction Railway.

History 
The first station opened as Cwmsyfiog and Brithdir on 1 February 1908 by the Brecon and Merthyr Tydfil Junction Railway. Its name was changed to Cwmsyfiog on 1 July 1924. It closed to passengers on 5 July 1937. The second station opened on the same day. While the first station was closed, it reopened to miners only on 6 December 1937. The second station closed on 31 December 1962 and the first station closed to miners on the same day.

References

External links 

Disused railway stations in Monmouthshire
Former Brecon and Merthyr Tydfil Junction Railway stations
Railway stations in Great Britain opened in 1908
Railway stations in Great Britain closed in 1937
Railway stations in Great Britain opened in 1937
Railway stations in Great Britain closed in 1962
1908 establishments in Wales
1962 disestablishments in Wales